Network Against Trafficking, Abuse and Labour (NACTAL) is an umbrella organisation of Nigerian non-governmental organizations engaged in advocacy and campaign for children's rights, anti-human trafficking, human rights abuse and child labour with some 220 member organizations in the six geopolitical zones of Nigeria and the Federal Capital Territory.

History 
NACTAL was founded in 2003 by the United Nations Children's Fund (formerly, United Nations International Children's Emergency Fund):, and registered by the Corporate Affairs Commission (CAC) in 2005. NACTAL also partners with Embassies, Government agencies e.g. National Agency for the Prohibition of Trafficking in Persons (NAPTIP), Nigeria Police Force (NPF), Nigeria Immigration Service (NIS), Expertise France, European Union, International Organization for Migration (IOM), A-TIPSOM|FIIAPP Nigeria Police.

Mission and activities 
The organization engaged in different activities including rescue of victims of human trafficking, anti-human trafficking campaigns, training, and implementation of programmes using the 5 P's to stop human trafficking which are as follows: prevention, protection, partnership, prosecution and policy.

Governance 
NACTAL is led by the Board of Trustees, National Executive Council (NEC) and six zonal coordinators. The board of trustee is chaired by Bolaji Owasanoye, national executive council is headed by Ustaz Amin O and the national president is Abdulganiyu Abubakar.

Membership
NACTAL has over 220 non-governmental organizations (NGOs), Faith Based Organizations(FBOs) and Community Based Organizations (CBOs) as members who are working in the area of anti-human trafficking, child protection, abuse/labour, irregular migration and smuggling of migrants in the six Geo-political zones of Nigeria and the Federal Capital Territory (FCT).

References 

Human trafficking in Nigeria
Human rights in Nigeria
Child abuse by country